The Republic of Vietnam National Police Administration Service (Vietnamese: Dịch vụ hành chính Cảnh Sát Quốc Gia Việt Nam) or ‘Service Administratif’ in French, was the bureaucratic and administrative department of the Republic of Vietnam National Police (Vietnamese: Cảnh Sát Quốc Gia – CSQG) from 1962 to 1975.

See also
 ARVN
 First Indochina War
 Republic of Vietnam
 Republic of Vietnam Military Forces
 Vietnam War
 Weapons of the Vietnam War

References
 Sir Robert Thompson et al., Report on the Republic of Vietnam National Police, 1971. [available online at http://www.counterinsurgency.org/1971%20Thompson%20Police/Thompson%20Police.htm]
 Valéry Tarrius, La Police de Campagne du Sud-Vietnam 1967-1975, in Armes Militaria Magazine, March 2005 issue, Histoire & Collections, Paris, pp. 37–43.  (in French)

External links
Federation of South Vietnam Police Associations (in Vietnamese)
The "White Mice" of Vietnam 
RVN National Police at globalsecurity.org
 http://camopedia.org/index.php?title=Republic_of_Vietnam
 http://www.polinsignia.com/vietnam.htm

Republic of Vietnam National Police
1975 disestablishments in Vietnam